Gerry McGowan may refer to:

 Gerry McGowan (Gaelic footballer), played for Sligo
 Gerry McGowan (Scottish footballer), played in the English Football League